The women's 10 metre platform diving competition at the 2020 Summer Olympics in Tokyo was held on 4 to 5 August 2021 at the Tokyo Aquatics Centre. It was the 25th appearance of the event, which has been held at every Olympic Games since the 1912 Summer Olympics.

Competition format 
The competition will be held in three rounds:
 Preliminary round: All divers perform five dives; the top 18 divers advance to the semi-final.
 Semi-final: The 18 divers perform five dives; the scores of the qualifications are erased and the top 12 divers advance to the final.
 Final: The 12 divers perform five dives; the semi-final scores are erased and the top three divers win the gold, silver and bronze medals accordingly.

Within each round of five dives, each dive must be from a different one of the six groups (forward, back, reverse, inward, twisting, and armstand). Each dive is assigned a degree of difficulty based on somersaults, position, twists, approach, and entry. There is no limit to the degree of difficulty of dives; the most difficult dives calculated in the FINA rulebook (reverse 4  somersault in pike position and armstand reverse 4 somersault in pike position) are 4.8, but competitors could attempt more difficult dives. Scoring is done by a panel of seven judges. For each dive, each judge gives a score between 0 and 10 with 0.5 point increments. The top two and bottom two scores are discarded. The remaining three scores are summed and multiplied by the degree of difficulty to give a dive score. The five dive scores are summed to give the score for the round.

Schedule 
All times are Japan standard time (UTC+9)

Qualification 

The top 12 divers at the 2019 World Aquatics Championships earned a quota spot for their NOC. The top diver at each of the 5 continental championships earned a spot (excluding divers who earned a spot at the World Championships and divers from NOCs that had already earned two spots). Additional quota places go to the next best finishers in the 2020 FINA World Cup (with the same limitations) until the maximum number of divers is reached. Divers must be at least 14 years old by the end of 2020 to compete.

Results

References

Diving at the 2020 Summer Olympics
2020
Women's events at the 2020 Summer Olympics